Edward Francis Butler Moore (30 January 1906 – 13 December 1997) was Bishop of Kilmore, Elphin and Ardagh from  1959 to 1981.

Life
His father was the Revd W.R.R Moore. He was educated at Drogheda Grammar School and Trinity College, Dublin. After ordination he was a curate in Bray and then held incumbencies at Castledermot and Greystones. He was Rural Dean of Delgany and (his final appointment before his ordination to the episcopate)  Archdeacon of Glendalough. His son was Jimmy Moore, who was a  Bishop of Connor.

Notes

1906 births

1997 deaths

Alumni of Trinity College Dublin

Archdeacons of Glendalough
20th-century Anglican bishops in Ireland
Bishops of Kilmore, Elphin and Ardagh
People educated at Drogheda Grammar School